Lajevardi is an Iranian surname. Notable people with the surname include:

 Kaave Lajevardi (born 1971), Iranian philosopher
 Zohreh Lajevardi, Iranian politician

Persian-language surnames